Lawrence Farley  (1856–1910) was a Major League Baseball outfielder. He played in fourteen games for the 1884 Washington Nationals and recorded 11 hits in 52 at-bats. He later managed the San Antonio club of the Texas League for part of the 1898 season.

Sources

Major League Baseball outfielders
Washington Nationals (AA) players
Baseball players from New York (state)
19th-century baseball players
Fort Wayne Hoosiers players
Minor league baseball managers
1856 births
1910 deaths